Restless is the fifth studio album by Shelby Lynne, released on July 18, 1995 on Magnatone Records, and later re-released on Curb Records. Lynne co-wrote six of the songs on the album. The album is considered the last in a series of efforts for Lynne to attract mainstream country music audiences, this time incorporating elements of western swing.  Lynne did not record another album with a Nashville-based record label until more than a decade later, when she signed with Lost Highway Records.

Reception

Writing for AllMusic, Thom Jurek praised several tracks including "Slow Me Down", "Restless", "Reach for the Rhythm" and "Swingtown" and overall, he described the album as a "slab of swinging-for-the-charts commercial country."

Track listing
 "Slow Me Down" (Stephanie Davis, Shelby Lynne, Brent Maher) – 3:14
 "Another Chance at Love" (Maher, Allen Shamblin) – 2:25
 "Talkin' to Myself Again" (Jamie O'Hara) – 3:18
 "Restless" (Lynne, Maher, O'Hara) – 3:05
 "Just for the Touch of Your Hand" (Lynne, Maher, O'Hara) – 3:56
 "Hey Now Little Darling" (Lynne, Maher, O'Hara) – 3:02
 "I'm Not the One" (Kent Blazy, Craig Wiseman) – 3:52
 "Reach for the Rhythm" (Lynne, Maher, O'Hara) – 2:20
 "Wish I Knew" (Rod McGaha) – 3:44
 "Swingtown" (Lynne, Maher, O'Hara) – 2:34

Personnel
 Pat Bergeson - harmonica (tracks 5 and 6), electric guitar (tracks 3, 5, 6, 7, 8, and 10), acoustic guitar (tracks 1 and 9)
 J. D. Blair - drums (track 10)
 Paul Franklin - steel guitar (track 9)
 Randy Howard - fiddle (tracks 1, 2, 3, 4, 7, 8, and 10)
 John Hughey - steel guitar (track 3 and 7)
 Roy Huskey Jr. - bass (tracks 2, 4, and 10)
 Paul Leim - percussion (track 1), drums (tracks 1-9)
 Brent Mason - electric guitar (tracks 2 and 4)
 Weldon Myrick - steel guitar (tracks 2, 4, 6, and 8)
 The Nashville String Machine - strings
 Bobby Ogdin - piano
 Don Potter - acoustic guitar (tracks 2, 3, 4, 6, 7, 8, and 10) 
 Michael Rhodes - bass (tracks 1, 5, 6, 8, and 9)
 Glenn Worf - bass (tracks 3 and 7)
 Mike Zikovich - accordion

Chart performance

References

1995 albums
Shelby Lynne albums
Albums produced by Brent Maher